Hasanpur Baru is a Village and a Gram Panchayat in Hathras district in the Indian state of Uttar Pradesh. A part of the Braj region, it is located in Sadabad Tehsil, in Aligarh Division.

History
"Hasanpur Baru" is a Gram Panchayat. It has two sub-villages, Narayanpur Bad and Baljit Garhi.

Education
Hasanpur Baru has some schools and a college. Shri Maharana Pratap JHS is the oldest school in the village. Also Primary School And Upper Primary School are located in Hasanpur Baru. For High Education, Shri Gandhi Inter College is located in the neighbouring village Mangru.

Demographics 

According to 2011 census of India, Hasanpur Baru has a population of 2,073. This includes 1079 males and 994 females.

Geography
Hasanpur Baru is located at .It is located in Hathres District of state Uttar Pradesh in Republic of India.

References

Cities and towns in Hathras district
Villages in Hathras district